Santa Rosa Rancheria is the reservation of the Santa Rosa Indian Community of the Santa Rosa Rancheria. It is the site of the Tachi Palace Hotel & Casino. The population was 517 at the time of the 2000 United States Census and had increased to 652 by the 2010 United States Census. In 2010, 288 residents (44.2% of the total) were under 18 and 29 (4.4%) were 65 and over.

Ruben Barrios was elected as the Tribal Chairman in 2009.  The previous Tribal Chairman, Clarence Atwell Jr., served in that position for 42 years and died in 2013.

Tachi history 
The Santa Rosa Rancheria belongs to the federally recognized Tachi-Yokuts Tribe. The Indians of the San Joaquin Valley were known as Yokuts.  The word "Yokuts" means people and the word "Tachi" means mud duck. By the end of the 19th century, the Tachi Yokuts Tribe was split across the central and southern parts of California. The Yokuts were divided into tribes with each having a name, a language, and a territory. They are called the seed-gatherers because they did no farming at all in the days before Columbus.  Their main food was acorns.  The Yokuts also ate wild plants, roots, and berries.  They hunted deer, rabbits, prairie dogs, and other small mammals and birds.  They made simple clothing out of bark and grass.  Their jewelry and headbands were made of seeds and feathers.

Citizenship 
The Citizenship Act of 1924 gave all Indians American citizenship rights while allowing them to retain their tribal citizenship but it made little difference in the way they were treated by the government. As part of their integration into the larger American society, the federal government sent their children to government schools, the religion was banned, and the teaching of the native language and culture was all but forbidden. Even after the land grabs and removal efforts had ceased, the damage had been done. The division of the native people, the suppression of the Indian culture, and the influence of the greater American society left them with few ties to the past. Aspirations for the future were being destroyed by the resulting economic hardships and prejudice. For generations, the native people have tried to support themselves as seasonal field laborers. Government regulations produced long term economic stagnation on the reservation, resulting in 85% unemployment, a crumbling infrastructure, and a cycle of poverty which ground away at the hope for a better future for their children.

Government 
The Tachi-Yokuts Tribe has a Tribal administrator and her name is Janice Cuara. Her job as the Tribal administrator means she is responsible for the daily operations of the Tribal Government's Central Administration Building. The tribal government consists of approximately 165 regular employees and fourteen departments. The Department Directors supervised under the Tribal Administrator are: Personnel, Housing, Membership, EPA, Public Safety, Tribal Social Services, Cultural, Internal Auditors, IT, Maintenance, TYEEC ( Early Ed. Center), Recreation, Education, Elders Center, Finance, and Administration staff.  Tribal Administrator is under the direction of the Tribal Council and shall carry out directives issued by the Tribal Council as required.  Assists and advises the Tribal Council on matters pertaining to Tribal Budget and Program operations. The Santa Rosa Rancheria Tribal council consists of six members. Ruben Barrios the chairman, Elmer Thomas the Vice-Chairman, Rafaella Dieter the Secretary, Dena Baga the Treasurer, Elaine Jeff and Patricia Davis as Delegates. Update: As of June 1, 2018 Elmer Thomas and Rafaella Dieter has been recalled and removed from their position.

Self-sufficiency and self-determination are the two most important goals of any sovereign nation, which is why we have fought so hard to establish and maintain our own form of government and reclaim our right to determine our own future. Thanks to the efforts of strong American Indian leaders, the federal government gradually acknowledged our rights. In 1988, Congress passed legislation providing a means for rebuilding our economy, our pride, and our hope: the Indian Gaming Regulatory Act (IGRA).

Rancheria 
In 1934, the Santa Rosa Rancheria was established on about 40 acres of desolate farmland in Lemoore, California. Forty people lived on the reservation below poverty level, many living in tule huts, tin houses, old cars and chicken coops. The average education on the reservation was 3rd grade level, with field labor as the primary source of income. By the 1980s the Santa Rosa Rancheria had grown to approximately 200 members and 170 acres. Government programs such as Headstart, 638 funds, and an AA program were in place, and the average education increased to 8th grade level. Some HUD housing was built, but living conditions were still below poverty level for most members.

Language 

The traditional language of the tribe is the Tachi Yokuts dialect of Valley Yokuts.

References

Further reading

External links
Tachi Yokut Tribe website

See also
List of Indian reservations in the United States

Yokuts
American Indian reservations in California
Kings County, California
Lemoore, California
San Joaquin Valley